The eleventh series of Geordie Shore, a British television programme based in Newcastle upon Tyne was confirmed on 23 May 2015 when it was confirmed that MTV had renewed the series for a further three series. The show began on 20 October 2015. This is the first series not to include original cast member James Tindale after he departed at the beginning of the previous series. Ahead of the series it was confirmed that the series would be filmed in Greece. In September 2015 when the series premiere was announced, it was confirmed that the cast members would air for 10 episodes, making it the longest series to date. It was also confirmed that the cast had travelled to Zante, Malia, Mykonos, Ios as well as Athens for the series.

Cast
 Aaron Chalmers
 Charlotte-Letitia Crosby
 Chloe Ferry
 Gary Beadle
 Holly Hagan
 Kyle Christie
 Marnie Simpson
 Nathan Henry
 Scott Timlin

Duration of cast 

 = Cast member is featured in this episode.
 = Cast member leaves the series.
 = Cast member does not feature in this episode.

Episodes

Ratings

References

2015 British television seasons
Series 11